Arnald may refer to:

Names
Jan Arnald (b. 1963), Swedish novelist and literary critic
George Arnald (1763–1841), British painter
Richard Arnald (1698–1756), English clergyman and biblical scholar
William Arnald (-1802), English clergyman and biblical scholar, son of Richard

Music
"Arnald", a song by Cardiacs from On Land and in the Sea
"Arnald", a song by Eureka Machines from Leader of the Starry Skies – A Loyal Companion